Gianluigi Quinzi was the defending champion but lost in the second round to Tomislav Brkić.

Stefano Travaglia won the title after defeating Oscar Otte 6–3, 6–7(3–7), 6–3 in the final.

Seeds
All seeds receive a bye into the second round.

Draw

Finals

Top half

Section 1

Section 2

Bottom half

Section 3

Section 4

References

External links
Main draw
Qualifying draw

Internazionali di Tennis d'Abruzzo - Singles
Internazionali di Tennis d'Abruzzo